Craig W. Reynolds (born March 15, 1953), is an artificial life and computer graphics expert, who created the Boids artificial life simulation in 1986. Reynolds worked on the film Tron (1982) as a scene programmer, and on Batman Returns (1992) as part of the video image crew. Reynolds won the 1998 Academy Scientific and Technical Award in recognition of "his pioneering contributions to the development of three-dimensional computer animation for motion picture production." He is the author of the OpenSteer library.

References

External links
Craig Reynolds' home page
OpenSteer

1953 births
People in information technology
Living people
Researchers of artificial life
Place of birth missing (living people)